Andrew Burton McBain (born January 18, 1965) is a Canadian former professional ice hockey player. McBain played eleven seasons in the National Hockey League between 1983 and 1994.

Playing career
As a youth, McBain played in the 1977 and 1978 Quebec International Pee-Wee Hockey Tournaments with the Toronto Young Nationals minor ice hockey team.

McBain was selected 8th overall in the 1983 NHL Entry Draft by the Winnipeg Jets after scoring 120 points in junior hockey the previous season for the North Bay Centennials. He stepped straight into the NHL in 1983–84 at the age of just 18, and turned in a promising rookie campaign with 11 goals and 19 assists for 30 points in 78 games.

McBain would struggle to build off his rookie campaign, however, and slumped to just 7 goals and 22 points in 1984–85. After scoring just 3 goals in 28 games to start the 1985–86 campaign, he suffered a serious knee injury which required surgery and ended his season. He returned in 1986–87 to post 11 goals and 32 points for the Jets, but was considered a disappointment to that point in his career.

However, McBain's career would take an upward turn when he was placed on a line with superstar center Dale Hawerchuk for the 1987–88 season and was finally able to show the talent which had made him such a high draft pick, finishing the year with 32 goals and 31 assists for 63 points. He proved especially deadly on the powerplay, where his 20 goals ranked him amongst the league leaders. He would be even better in 1988–89, as he recorded career highs of 37 goals and 40 assists for 77 points, and again scored 20 goals on the powerplay. At the conclusion of the season, he represented Canada at the 1989 World Ice Hockey Championships, and helped the team to a silver medal with 6 goals in 10 games.

Following the season, though, McBain was dealt to the Pittsburgh Penguins in a move which would ultimately derail his career. Expected to be another offensive weapon on a star-studded Penguin team, McBain was beaten out for a scoring-line right wing spot by rookie Mark Recchi and found himself mired on the team's fourth line. He scored only 5 goals and 14 points in 41 games for Pittsburgh before being dealt mid-season to the Vancouver Canucks. He wouldn't fare any better in Vancouver, and finished the season with just 9 goals and 23 points in 67 games.

In 1990–91, McBain was assigned to the minors for the first time in his career, and spent most of the next two seasons in the IHL with the Milwaukee Admirals. He appeared in just 19 games for the Canucks over that stretch, scoring only one goal.

NHL expansion in the early 1990s provided an opportunity for McBain to get his career back on track, and he signed with the Ottawa Senators for their inaugural season in 1992–93. He appeared in 59 games for the Senators, scoring 7 goals and 23 points. He fared better in 1993–94, with 11 goals in 55 games for Ottawa, his highest total since 1989. At the end of the season, however, he was released.

McBain spent two more seasons toiling in the IHL before retiring in 1996. He finished his NHL career with totals of 129 goals and 172 assists for 301 points in 608 games, along with 633 penalty minutes.

Career statistics

Regular season and playoffs

International statistics

Awards
OHL Second All-Star Team (1983)

Transactions
December 8, 1985 – Missed majority of 1985-86 due to knee injury vs. the Los Angeles Kings.
June 17, 1989 – Traded to the Pittsburgh Penguins by the Winnipeg Jets with Jim Kyte and Randy Gilhen for Randy Cunneyworth, Rick Tabaracci and Dave McLlwain.
January 8, 1990 – Traded to the Vancouver Canucks by the Pittsburgh Penguins with Dave Capuano and Dan Quinn for Rod Buskas, Barry Pederson and Tony Tanti.
July 30, 1992 – Signed as a free agent by the Ottawa Senators.

References

External links
 

1965 births
Canadian ice hockey right wingers
Living people
Ice hockey people from Toronto
National Hockey League first-round draft picks
Niagara Falls Flyers players
North Bay Centennials players
Ottawa Senators players
Pittsburgh Penguins players
Vancouver Canucks players
Winnipeg Jets (1979–1996) draft picks
Winnipeg Jets (1979–1996) players